Robert Makzoumi (1918 – 19 May 2006) was an Egyptian basketball player. He competed in the men's tournament at the 1948 Summer Olympics.

References

1918 births
2006 deaths
Egyptian men's basketball players
Olympic basketball players of Egypt
Basketball players at the 1948 Summer Olympics
Sportspeople from Cairo